Municipal elections were held in the Canadian province of Prince Edward Island on November 3, 2014.

Charlottetown

Cornwall

Stratford

Summerside

External links
Elections Prince Edward Island

References

Elections in Prince Edward Island
2014 elections in Canada
Municipal elections in Prince Edward Island